Copper silicide can refer to either  or pentacopper silicide, .

Pentacopper silicide is a binary compound of silicon with copper. It is an intermetallic compound, meaning that it has properties intermediate between an ionic compound and an alloy. This solid crystalline material is a silvery solid that is insoluble in water.  It forms upon heating mixtures of copper and silicon.

Applications
Copper silicide thin film is used for passivation of copper interconnects, where it serves to suppress diffusion and electromigration and serves as a diffusion barrier.

Copper silicides are invoked in the Direct process, the industrial route to organosilicon compounds.  In this process, copper, in the form of its silicide, catalyses the addition of methyl chloride to silicon. An illustrative reaction affords the industrially useful dimethyldichlorosilane:
2 CH3Cl + Si → (CH3)2SiCl2

References

Copper compounds
Transition metal silicides